The 2011–12 season was the 108th season in Schalke 04's history. The team competed in the Bundesliga, DFB-Pokal and the UEFA Europa League. The team's top scorer was Klaas-Jan Huntelaar with 29 goals in the Bundesliga and 48 in total.

Review and events

Competitions

Legend

Bundesliga

League table

Matches

DFB-Pokal

DFL-Supercup

UEFA Europa League

Play-off round

Group stage

Knockout phase

Round of 32

Round of 16

Quarter-finals

Player information

Roster and statistics

1.Teemu Pukki played four matches and scored two goals in the 2011–12 UEFA Champions League qualifying phase and played two matches and scored three goals in the 2011–12 UEFA Europa League for HJK.

Transfers

In

Out

Coaching staff
- Felix Magath (Head Coach)

Kits

Sources

Schalke 04
FC Schalke 04 seasons
Schalke 04